Our Last Best Chance: The Pursuit of Peace in a Time of Peril (Arabic: فرصتنا الأخيرة: السعي نحو السلام في وقت الخطر ) is a book written by King Abdullah II of Jordan and published by Viking Press in New York City. The book is available in eight languages, highlights King Abdullah's vision towards resolving the Arab–Israeli conflict, as well as the challenges facing the Middle East.

Book contents
In “Our Last Best Chance”, King Abdullah writes as both a monarch bestowing wisdom from above and as a man whose life has been intertwined with war and making the case for peace.
The memoir opens during the 1967 war, when the King, then a toddler, is dared by his brother to race across the lawn in the middle of an Israeli air raid. An explosion reverberates in the distance and the then-crown prince runs back into the house without having reached the other side. The incident serves as a potent symbol: Unsolved, the Israeli-Palestinian conflict looms over the region, threatening to disrupt daily life at a moment's notice.
The King goes on to detail his formative years, from staring down anti-Arab stereotypes at a US boarding school to his military career in Zarqa and proposing to Rania Yassin on Tal Rumman.

In the first two parts of the memoir, covering the King's childhood up to his ascension to the Throne, King Hussein looms large, offering his son lessons in honour and diplomacy while steering Jordan through uncertain waters.
When King Hussein falls ill, and the line of succession unexpectedly falls to the author, King Abdullah provides an intimate account of how he faced the sudden responsibility of becoming King while coming to terms with his father's death. Upon ascending to the Throne, overhauling the country's economy was a top priority, the King writes, listing Jordan's membership in the World Trade Organization and the US Free Trade Agreement among his top achievements in his first years.
King Abdullah goes on to highlight Jordanian success stories, including Maktoob.com, Rubicon, the King's Academy, the King Abdullah Design Bureau, the domestic film industry and the peaceful nuclear program, taking clear pride in each as a success for the country, each innovation as a step forward in the Kingdom's development process. But, as the King notes, governance is not as orderly as the army. Directives go unheeded, deadlines are missed and rather than bullets or mortars, progress is threatened by excuses and delays.

Despite the initial progress on the economic front, King Abdullah candidly admits that political development in the Kingdom over the past decade has at times been “two steps forward, one step back”.
“Some have resisted change out of fear of losing privileges they have long enjoyed, while others simply lacked imagination,” King Abdullah writes.
“Some officials did not have the courage to push forward with difficult changes.”
The Monarch goes on to note a “dysfunctional” relationship between executive and legislative authorities, “hindering efforts to address broader social and economic issues”. He notes that such tensions and the public's loss of faith in the 15th Parliament in 2009 led to its dissolution.
While delving into affairs at home, the memoir also sheds light on life as the head of state in a dangerous neighbourhood. The country is tested by the fallout of the US invasion of Iraq, followed by the Lebanon-Israeli conflict and the war on Gaza.
The King notes that in each conflict, Jordan played a role larger than its size, sending medical aid and field hospitals, organizing aid convoys, repairing airports and hosting thousands of refugees.

“Our Last Best Chance” goes on to highlight Jordan's role in combating takfiri ideology and clarifying the true nature of Islam through the Amman Message.
In the closing chapters, the King focuses on the peace process: warning that the negotiations launched by the Obama administration in late 2009 may be the last call for a region that has been disappointed time and time again by diplomatic failures, Israeli intransigence and violent provocations.
The King details the hurdles facing the launch of negotiations, including pressure from Arab states to revoke the Arab Peace Initiative over the Gaza war and the unsure partner in peace in Israeli Prime Minister Benjamin Netanyahu.
The King warns that at the time of printing, hopes for a breakthrough were fading and negotiations were “on the verge of collapse”. Indeed, talks have since derailed, and the forecasts for a return to the negotiating table have been less than promising.
Reflecting on King Hussein's four decades and his own 11-year pursuit of peace, the Monarch voices hope that Crown Prince Hussein will not have to face the lingering effects of a conflict whose resolution has eluded generations.
In order to end the impasse, the Monarch touts the “57-state solution”, or the Arab Peace Initiative, whereby Arab and Muslim states agree to normalize relations with Israel in return for occupied lands and a Palestinian state on 1967 borders.
The King remains blunt about the current situation: “I fear that we are slipping into the darkness.”
Despite the talk of benchmarks and roadmaps, the King argues that leaders and politicians must bear the responsibility of making the “much eroded dream” of peace come true.

In the book, the King uses plain language to explain the complex past, present and future of the region, choosing the steady tone of a commander rather than the prose of a politician.
While largely steering away from the sentimental, the Monarch does offer some intimate accounts of larger-than-life figures; dynamite fishing with Uday and Qusay Hussein, disagreements with former US President George Bush and Yasser Arafat's escape from Jordan in the guise of a woman.
The King also delves into his relationship with family members, telling of parachuting with Princess Aisha and the tensions raised by the question of the line of succession.
Despite the insightful asides, the memoir's lasting impressions are lessons from a man and a country who although have been blessed to live in peace and security are touched by the conflicts of its neighbours.

More than a personal history, the King's first book serves as a message for Washington policy makers, Israeli politicians and Arab leaders to sit up, take notice and not miss “our last, best chance”.

Reviews 
The Globe and Mail published a supportive but also mixed review by Michael D. Bell, a scholar in international diplomacy at the University of Windsor. Bell stated that he found "value and veracity in much of" the book, and he commented as well that the King "may prove as successful as his father, if not more so." Bell criticized the book for the lack of detail about the King's important relationship with his mother, Princess Muna, and his English grandfather, Tony Gardner, as well as for displaying a "paternalism... by personalizing good governance in a single all-powerful individual."

The Spectator published a positive review by journalist Justin Marozzi. Marozzi referred to it as an "engrossing book" that "avowedly mixes the personal with the political." Marozzi highlighted in particular the King's depiction of him and his four brothers as the five fingers on a hand- with the King saying "If you are well-meaning, we extend the hand of friendship; but when outsiders try to harm the family, we band together and become a fist."

Further reading 
 al-Hussein, Abdullah II bin. Our Last Best Chance: The Pursuit of Peace in a Time of Peril, New York City: Viking Adult, 2011.

References 

Official page on Facebook
https://www.facebook.com/OurLastBestChance

External links 
 https://www.amazon.com/Our-Last-Best-Chance-Pursuit/dp/0670021717

Books about the Arab–Israeli conflict
Political books
Books by Jordanian writers
2011 non-fiction books
Viking Press books